NHL 2014 may refer to:
2013–14 NHL season
2014–15 NHL season
NHL 14, video game
2014 National Hurling League